Second County Courthouse may refer to any of numerous courthouses which were second-built in their counties, including:

Second St. Joseph County Courthouse, South Bend, Indiana
Second Arenac County Courthouse, Omer, Michigan
Second Tompkins County Courthouse, Ithaca, New York

See also
Tallahatchie County Second District Courthouse, Sumner, Mississippi
Third County Courthouse (disambiguation)
Fourth County Courthouse (disambiguation)